Nyam-Osoryn Tuyaa (born 1958) is a former Mongolian politician, and the acting Prime Minister from 22 to 30 July 1999. She also served as Chairperson of the 55th session of the United Nations Economic and Social Commission for Asia and the Pacific (ESCAP).

Tuyaa was the foreign minister in the Democratic Party-led government under Janlavyn Narantsatsralt, being appointed in 1998. When this government was forced to resign the following year, she became acting Prime Minister for a short time before parliament elected Rinchinnyamyn Amarjargal. She then served as foreign minister in the new government until it was defeated in the 2000 elections. She herself lost her seat in parliament (for a district in Khentii Province) in the same elections, which saw the People's Revolution Party win all but four of the seats.

References

1958 births
Living people
Democratic Party (Mongolia) politicians
Female foreign ministers
Members of the State Great Khural
Prime Ministers of Mongolia
Women prime ministers
Women government ministers of Mongolia
20th-century Mongolian women politicians
20th-century Mongolian politicians
Mongolian women diplomats
Foreign ministers of Mongolia